Angelika van der Linde-Ploumbidis (Angelika van der Linde) is a statistician. She earned a Ph.D in 1982 or 1983 at the Freie Universität Berlin with the dissertation Zur numerischen Behandlung von Versuchsplanungsproblemen für lineare Regressionsmodelle mit korrelierten Beobachtungen .

In addition to her influential work in Bayesian statistical theory, she works in numerical analysis, probability theory and stochastic processes, geophysics and systems theory.

References 

Bayesian statisticians
Women statisticians
Free University of Berlin alumni
Living people
Year of birth missing (living people)